The Arkansas–Pine Bluff Golden Lions football program represents the University of Arkansas at Pine Bluff in college football as the NCAA Division I Football Championship Subdivision (FCS) level as a member of the Southwestern Athletic Conference (SWAC). The Lions play their home games at Simmons Bank Field in Pine Bluff, Arkansas.

Conference memberships
 Independent (1923–1935, 1970–1972)
 Southwestern Athletic Conference (1936–1969, 1998–present) 
 NCAA Division II independent (1973–1982)
 NAIA independent (1983–1984, 1987–1997)
 Arkansas Intercollegiate Conference (1985–1986)

Major Classic
Southern Heritage Classic

Championships

National

Conference championships

Division championships

Playoff appearances

NAIA 
The Golden Lions appeared in the NAIA playoffs two times. Their combined record was 3–2.

Notable players

Alumni in the NFL
Over 29 Arkansas Pine Bluff alumni have played in the NFL, including:

LC Greenwood
Terron Armstead
Greg Wesley
Dante Wesley
Jamie Gillan
Courtney Van Buren
Mark Bradley
Caesar Belser
Chris Akins
Charles Ali
Brian Jones (tight end)
Greg Briggs
Robert Brown
Wallace Francis
Willie Fraizer
Ernest Grant
Gene Jeter
Mike Lewis
Cleo Miller
Ray Nealy
Terry Nelson
Willie Parker (defensive tackle)
Rickey Parks
Manny Sistrunk
Clarence Washington
Monk Williams
Don Zimmerman (wide receiver)
Raymond Webber
Martell Mallett

References

External links
 

 
American football teams established in 1916
1916 establishments in Arkansas